Team Xtreme may refer to:

 Team Xtreme, a professional wrestling tag team better known as The Hardy Boyz
 Team Xtreme Racing (NASCAR), a stock car team that operated from 2009–2015
 Team Xtreme Racing (IndyCar), an open-wheel racing team that operated from 1999–2001

A collection of lads from Shropshire prone to throwing themselves down hills ( active 2002 to present )